Théâtre Hébertot is a theatre at 78, boulevard des Batignolles, in the 17th arrondissement of Paris, France.

History 
The theatre, completed in 1838 and opening as the Théâtre des Batignolles, was later renamed Théâtre des Arts in 1907. Jacques Rouché was the director of the theatre from 1910-1913. It acquired its present name in 1940 after playwright and journalist Jacques Hébertot.

Current Use 
Théâtre Hébertot has a seating capacity of 630 for the main stage, and completed construction on a smaller stage, l'Petit Hébertot, in 2001. The Hebertot is one of the few Paris theaters that has shows in English as well as French.

Danièle and Pierre Franck are its current directors.

Productions 

 1911: Le Chagrin dans le palais de Han (Grief at the Han Palace) by Louis Laloy, directed by Jacques Rouché
 1913: L'incoronazione di Poppea by Claudio Monteverdi, produced by Jacques Rouché
 1925: Henry IV by Luigi Pirandello, directed by  Georges Pitoëff
 1925: Saint Joan by George Bernard Shaw, directed by  Georges Pitoëff
 1925: Le Juif du pape  by Edmond Fleg, directed by  Georges Pitoëff
 1925: Le Lâche by Henri-René Lenormand, directed by  Georges Pitoëff
 1925: L'Assoiffé by A. Derera, directed by  Georges Pitoëff
 1926: L'Un d'eux by Émile Mazaud, directed by  Georges Pitoëff
 1926: L'Âme en peine by Jean-Jacques Bernard, directed by  Georges Pitoëff
 1926: Comme ci (ou comme ça) by Luigi Pirandello, directed by  Georges Pitoëff
 1926: Orphée by Jean Cocteau, directed by  Georges Pitoëff
 1926: Et dzim la la... by Marcel Achard, directed by  Georges Pitoëff
 1926: Sardanapale by Boussac de Saint-Marc, directed by  Georges Pitoëff
 1926: Jean Le Maufranc by Jules Romains, directed by  Georges Pitoëff
 1927: Le Marchand de regrets by Fernand Crommelynck, directed by  Georges Pitoëff
 1938: Le bal des voleurs by Jean Anouilh, directed by André Barsacq, with Jean Dasté, Michel Vitold and Maurice Jacquemont
 1944: Néron by Jean Bacheville, directed by Alfred Pasquali, with Marcelle Géniat and Georges Marchal
 1945: Caligula by Albert Camus, directed by Paul Œttly, with Gérard Philipe, Michel Bouquet, Georges Vitaly
 1949: Les Justes by Albert Camus, directed by  Paul Œttly, with María Casares, Michel Bouquet, Serge Reggiani
 1953: La Maison de la nuit by Thierry Maulnier, directed by  Marcelle Tassencourt with Pierre Vaneck, and Michel Vitold
 1954: Pour le roi de Prusse written and directed by Maurice Bray
 1956: Lady Windermere's Fan by Oscar Wilde, directed by Marcelle Tassencourt
 1959: Long Day's Journey into Night by Eugene O'Neill, directed by Marcelle Tassencourt
 1964: Yerma by Federico García Lorca, directed by Bernard Jenny, with Loleh Bellon
 1965: The Collection and The Lover by Harold Pinter, directed by Claude Régy, with Delphine Seyrig, Jean Rochefort, Michel Bouquet
 1966: The Three Sisters by Anton Tchekov, adaptation by Georges Pitoëff and Pierre Jean Jouve, directed by André Barsacq with Marina Vlady, Odile Versois and Hélène Vallier
 1976: Le Jardin de craie by Enid Bagnold
 1987: Une chambre sur la Dordogne by Claude Rich, directed by  Jorge Lavelli
 1987: L'Idée fixe by Paul Valéry, directed by Bernard Murat, with Pierre Arditi
 1989: La vie que je t'ai donnée by Luigi Pirandello, directed by Michel Dumoulin, with María Casares
 1998: « Art » by Yasmina Reza with Pierre Vaneck, Jean Rochefort and Jean-Louis Trintignant
 1998: L'Atelier by Jean-Claude Grumberg, directed by Gildas Bourdet
 1999: Raisons dey famille by Gérald Aubert, directed by Gildas Bourdet with Jacques Gamblin, Geneviève Fontanel
 2001: Les Fausses Confidences by Pierre Carlet de Chamblain de Marivaux, directed by Gildas Bourdet, with Danièle Lebrun and Gérard Desarthe
 2002: Comédie sur un quai de gare by Samuel Benchetrit, with Marie and Jean-Louis Trintignant
 2004: Le roi se meurt by Eugène Ionesco, directed by Georges Werler, with Michel Bouquet and Juliette Carré
 2005: Moins 2 written and directed by  Samuel Benchetrit, with Jean-Louis Trintignant and Roger Dumas
 2005: Le journal de Jules Renard by Jules Renard
 2006: Doute by John Patrick Shanley, directed by  Roman Polanski, with Thierry Frémont
 2006: Opus Cœur by Israel Horovitz, directed by Stéphan Meldegg, with Pierre Vaneck and Astrid Veillon
 2007: Irrésistible by Fabrice Roger-Lacan, directed by  Isabelle Nanty, with Virginie Ledoyen and Arié Elmaleh
 2007: Thalasso by Amanda Sthers, directed by Stéphan Guérin-Tillié, with Gérard Darmon, Thierry Frémont
 2008: L'antichambre by Jean-Claude Brisville, directed by Christophe Lidon, with Danièle Lebrun, Sarah Biasini, Roger Dumas
 2009: Cochons d'Inde by Sébastien Thiéry, directed by Anne Bourgeois, with Patrick Chesnais, Josiane Stoléru
 2009: Jules et Marcel after the correspondence between Raimu and Marcel Pagnol, directed by Jean-Pierre Bernard, with Michel Galabru, Philippe Caubère
 2009: La serva amorosa by Carlo Goldoni, directed by Christophe Lidon, with Robert Hirsch, Clémentine Célarié, Claire Nadeau
 2010: The Master Builder by Henrik Ibsen, directed by  Hans Peter Cloos, with Jacques Weber, Mélanie Doutey, Édith Scob
 2010: Éclats by vie written and directed by Jacques Weber, with Jacques Weber
 2011: Toutou by Agnès and Daniel Besse, directed by Anne Bourgeois, with Patrick Chesnais, Josiane Stoléru and Sam Karmann

External links

References 

Buildings and structures in the 17th arrondissement of Paris
Theatres completed in 1838
Theatres in Paris
1838 establishments in France